Jackson Appleyard (birth registered second ¼ 1931) is an English former professional rugby league footballer who played in the 1950s. He played at club level for Castleford (Heritage № 354).

References

External links
Search for "Appleyard" at rugbyleagueproject.org
Appleyard Memory Box Search at archive.castigersheritage.com

1931 births
Living people
Castleford Tigers players
English rugby league players
Rugby league players from Pontefract